Laura de la Uz (born 14 February 1970) is a Cuban film, television and theatre actress. She appeared in the theatre drama "Un Rayo de Esperanza" in 2020 Cubacultura.
She was nominated for Platino Award for Best Actress twice.

Career
Laura de la Uz graduated from the National School of Theater Instructors of Havana in 1992 (specializing in acting, directing and pedagogy). While still a student, in 1990, she starred in the film Hello Hemingway directed by Fernando Pérez, for which she won the Coral Award for the best female performance at the XII International Festival of New Latin American Cinema. She has since developed a career that spans both film, theater and television. Her performances in Cuban theater classics such as "Electra Garrigó" or "La Boda" and in serials such as "Blanco y Negro ¡No!" And "Oh, La Habana!" were highly praised by the Cuban public and critics. In 2000 she graduated as an international comedian from the International School of Gesture and Image "La Mancha" in Santiago de Chile, specializing in movement, mime, masks, white pantomime, comic strip, art comedy, melodrama, choir, tragedy, jester and clown. In 2001 he directed the play "Mentita's bar" with the theater company "La Sombra", from Santiago de Chile. In 2014 she wrote and directed the play "Laura de la Uz's Reality Show", performed in three sessions at the Mella Theater in Havana in October and December 2014. de la Uz is the only actress to twice win the Coral Award for Best Actress at the Havana Film Festival. She also had two nominations for Best Actress at the Film Platino Awards.

Filmography

Films 
Hello Hemingway (1990) Dir. Fernando Pérez
Ellos también comieron chocolate suizo (cortometraje, 1991) Dir. Manuel Marcel
Una pistola de verdad (cortometraje, 1992) Dir. Eduardo de la Torre
Historia de un amor adolescente (cortometraje, 1992) Dir. Juanita Medina
Madagascar (1993) Dir. Fernando Pérez
Amores (1994) Dir. José Sanjurjo
La muerte (cortometraje, 1994). Dir. Gabriela Valentá
Historias clandestinas de La Habana (1996) Dir. Diego Musik
Siberia (2006) Dir. Renata Duque
Divina desmesura (El Benny) (2006) Dir. Jorge Luis Sánchez
Homo sapiens (cortometraje, 2006) Dir. Eduardo del Llano
Liberia (cortometraje, 2007) Dir. Renata Duque
El cuerno de la abundancia (2008) Dir. Juan Carlos Tabío
La Habana, isla de la belleza (2008), de Nelson Navarro
Los minutos, las horas (cortometraje, 2009) Dir. Janaina Marques
Boleto al Paraíso (2009) Dir. Gerardo Chijona
Aché (cortometraje, 2010) Dir. Eduardo del Llano
Acorazado (2010) Dir. Álvaro Curiel
Extravíos (2011) Dir. Alejandro Gil
Y, sin embargo… (2012) Dir. Rudy Mora
Amor crónico (2012) Dir. Jorge Perugorría
Siete días en La Habana (2012) Dir. Benicio del Toro
La película de Ana (2012) Dir Daniel Díaz-Torres
Esther en alguna parte (2012) Dir. Gerardo Chijona
Vestido de novia (2014) Dir Marylin Solaya
Una historia con Cristo y Jesús, (cortometraje, 2014) Dir. Oldren Romero
La pared de las palabras (2014) Dir. Fernando Pérez
Espejuelos oscuros (2015) Dir Jessica Rodríguez
Yuli (2018) Dir Iciar Bollain

Television 
El naranjo del patio (1991) Dir. Xiomara Blanco
La amada móvil (1992) Dir. Camilo Hernández.
Konrad (1992) Dir. José Luis Yánez
Pocholo y su pandilla (1992) Dir. Charlie Medina
Blanco y Negro ¡No! (1993) Dir. Charlie Medina
A lo mejor para el año que viene (teleserie, 1996) Dir. Héctor Quintero
Punto G (2004) Dir. Miguel Brito
Oh! La Habana (teleserie, 2006–2007) Dir. Charlie Medina
En el corredor de la muerte (teleserie, 2019) Dir. Carlos Marqués-Marcet

Theatre 
Mascarada Casal (1993) Dir. Armando Suárez Del Villar
El Rey no ha muerto (1995) Dir. Allen Euclides.
La boda (1997) Dir. Raúl Martín. Teatro de la Luna (Cuba)
Mentita´s bar (2001). Dir. Laura de la Uz. Compañía La Sombra (Chile)
Electra Garrigó (2006-2007) Dir. Raúl Martín. Teatro de la Luna (Cuba)
Delirio habanero (2006-2012) Dir. Raúl Martín. Teatro de la Luna (Cuba)
Heaven (2008-2011) Dir. Raúl Martín. Teatro de la Luna (Cuba)
La Dama del Mar (2012) Dir. Raúl Martín. Teatro de la Luna (Cuba)
El Reality Show de Laura de la Uz (2014) Dir. Laura de la Uz/Raúl Martín. Teatro Mella (Cuba)
Cómo ser una estrella en Cuba y no morir en el intento (2014) Dir. Laura de la Uz (España/Cuba)
Un Rayo Esperanza (2020)

References

External links 

Living people
1970 births
Actresses from Havana
Cuban film actresses
Cuban television actresses